The Spink Farm is a historic farm at 1325 Shermantown Road in North Kingstown, Rhode Island.  The only surviving element of the farmstead on this  farm is the main house, a -story five-bay wood-frame structure built in 1798 by Isaac Spink.  The house exhibits modest Federal styling, its doorway flanked by small sidelight windows and simple pilasters, and topped by a shallow hood.  The interior follows a typical center-chimney plan, with its original Federal period fireplace mantels intact.  The house has been extended to the rear by a kitchen ell and porch, both added in the 20th century.  The house is one of a small number of 18th-century farmsteads left in the town.

The farm was listed on the National Register of Historic Places in 1985.

See also
National Register of Historic Places listings in Washington County, Rhode Island

References

Houses in North Kingstown, Rhode Island
1798 establishments in Rhode Island
Farms on the National Register of Historic Places in Rhode Island
Historic districts on the National Register of Historic Places in Rhode Island
National Register of Historic Places in Washington County, Rhode Island